Disco Montego is the second studio album by Australian pop duo Disco Montego. It was released in September 2002 and peaked at number 17 in Australia (see 2002 in music).

Reviews
Annemarie Failla from Female said; "To get the right vibe happening on the album, Darren and Dennis set about finding fresh faces on the music scene, to lend their vocal talents. The end result is an intoxicating cocktail of surprise and delight; a musical journey spanning the 70s through to the new millennium" adding "With such a diverse collection of dance tracks, this debut album from Disco Montego is tipped to be one of the hottest and coolest albums released this year and will certainly blow your mind!".

Track listing
 CD
 "Magic" (featuring Katie Underwood) -3:53
 "All I Want" (featuring Daniel Merriweather) - 5:10
 "Alive" (featuring Jade McRae) - 4:36
 "We Got Love" - 5:43
 "Beautiful" (featuring Katie Underwood) - 3:42
 "I Belong To You" (featuring Jeremy Gregory) - 5:32
 "Get Me Started" - 4:59
 "If Only Tonite" (featuring Jade McRae) - 4:08
 "Because of You" (Dance Mix) - 7:04
 "Turning Around" (featuring Juanita Tippins) - 4:43
 "Stand Up" (featuring Rob Woolf) - 4:49
 "U Talkin' to Me" - 5:10

Bonus Remix disc
 "We Got Love" (Studio 347 Mix) - 8:06
 "Beautiful" (Disco Montego Remix) - 5:58
 "Magic" (Mark John & Simon Grey 12" L.A.P Ride) - 8:04
 "Beautiful" (James Ash Mix) - 6:02

Charts

Sources

2002 albums